Maria Komnene (or Comnena) (Maria Komnēnē; Constantinople, March 1152 – July 1182) was the eldest daughter of the Emperor Manuel I Komnenos by his first wife, Bertha of Sulzbach. She was known as the Porphyrogennete (Πορφυρογέννητη) or Porphyrogenita because she had been "born in the Purple Chamber", i.e. born in the Palace at Constantinople to the wife of a reigning emperor.

Maria was probably born in March 1152. In 1163 she was engaged to the future King Béla III of Hungary; Manuel, no longer expecting to father a legitimate son, was at that time ready to designate Béla (whom he had given the new court dignity of despotes and had renamed "Alexios") as his eventual successor. This engagement was broken off in 1169, soon after Manuel's son Alexios was born. Maria was then engaged to King William II of Sicily, but this engagement, too, was broken off by her father. Finally, in 1179, Maria was married to Renier of Montferrat, who was renamed "John" and given the title of Caesar.

After the death of the Emperor Manuel in 1180, Maria and Renier became involved in intrigues against Maria's stepmother, Maria of Antioch, who was ruling as regent for her young son, now Emperor Alexios II. A riot broke out against the empress, encouraged by Maria and Renier, but their attempt to seize power failed. Both died soon afterwards, apparently by poison, soon after the seizure of the regency by Andronikos Komnenos, a paternal first cousin of Manuel.

It seems that Maria never bore a child.

Sources

Choniates, Niketas, Historia, ed. J.-L. Van Dieten, 2 vols., Berlin and New York, 1975; trans. as O City of Byzantium, Annals of Niketas Choniates, by H.J. Magoulias, Detroit; Wayne State University Press, 1984.
Garland, Lynda, & Stone, Andrew, "Maria Porphyrogenita, daughter of Manuel I Comnenus" De Imperatoribus Romanis (external link)

1152 births
1182 deaths
12th-century Byzantine women
Assassinated Byzantine people
Byzantine people of the Crusades
Murdered royalty
Deaths by poisoning
Maria
Manuel I Komnenos
Porphyrogennetoi